Island is an instrumental album by David Arkenstone with Andrew White, released in 1989. It is a departure from Arkenstone's mostly electronic debut album Valley in the Clouds.

Track listing
"Nantucket" – 3:14
"Ballet" – 4:08
"The Island Road" – 3:28
"Desert Ride" – 4:10
"Along the Shoreline" – 3:26
"Caravan" – 3:46
"Hindu Holiday" – 4:05
"Passage" – 4:44
"Nullarbor" – 4:32
"The Palace" – 4:32
"Carnation Lily Lily Rose" – 4:46
 Tracks 2, 3, 6, 8, and 10 composed by David Arkenstone. Tracks 1, 4, 7, and 9 composed by David Arkenstone and Andrew White. Tracks 5 and 11 composed by Andrew White.
Notes
 "The Island Road" and "Caravan" is most well-known around the web as being one of the background tracks used in the "Chuck E. Cheese's University" training videotapes from 1991.

Personnel
 David Arkenstone – keyboards,Korg M1, grand piano, guitar, flute, pennywhistle
 Andrew White – acoustic guitar, bass on "Along the Shoreline," keyboards
 Daniel Chase – drums, percussion
 Bruce Bowers – violin
 Roger Fiets – bass, fretless bass
 John Seydewitz – percussion
 Jay Leslie – flute, soprano saxophone
 Nancy Rumbel – oboe, English horn

References

1989 albums
David Arkenstone albums
Narada Productions albums